Borghild is an EP by Die Warzau, released on September 30, 2009 by Pulseblack. It was given away for a limited time during the release party of I:Scintilla's 2010 album Dying and Falling. It was then made available for sale as a music download on March 20, 2013.

Track listing

Personnel
Adapted from the Borghild liner notes.

Die Warzau
 Van Christie – lead vocals, instruments, production, recording, mixing, editing
 Dan Evans – instruments, production, recording, mixing, editing
 Abel Garibaldi – instruments, production, recording, mixing, editing
 Jim Marcus – instruments, production, recording, mixing, editing, photography, design
 Chris Smits (as Xmas Smits) – instruments, production, recording, mixing, editing

Production and design
 Brian Gaynor – vocal recording (1)

Release history

References

External links 
 Borghild at Bandcamp
 Borghild at Discogs (list of releases)

2009 EPs
Die Warzau albums